Otto-Ernst Flick (1916–1974) was the oldest of three sons born to Friedrich Flick and wife Marie Schuss in 1916 in Germany.

Biography 
He entered the Friedrich Flick Industry Holding Company in 1953, but had a fall-out with his father in about 1960. Otto-Ernst took his father to court to secure his inheritance, and after a prolonged struggle, received a payment for settlement. He retired in Düsseldorf and died in 1974. His surviving brother, Friedrich Karl Flick gained full control of the business after he paid out the children of Otto-Ernst.

See also 
 Flick family

1916 births
1974 deaths
Otto-Ernst